Merrifieldia brandti is a moth of the family Pterophoridae that is endemic Iran (including Miyan Kotal).

References

Moths described in 1981
brandti
Moths of the Middle East